Gundars Vētra (born 22 May 1967) is a Latvian former professional basketball player and a current coach. He most recently served as a head coach of Spartak St. Petersburg.

He was the first Latvian to play in the National Basketball Association (NBA). He played one season for the Minnesota Timberwolves from 1992–1993.

Coaching career
After finishing his playing career, Vētra became a coach. He first started as head coach of Barons, leading them to their first ever LBL finals appearance in 2005. For the 2005-06 season he was an assistant to Sharon Drucker with Ural Great. Following a season in Russia, Vētra returned to Latvia, where he re-united with Barons. His second stint with Barons wasn't as good as expected, and Vētra left them to try his hand in women's basketball. After four seasons in Russia he went back to Latvia, joining BK Ventspils, where his team made the Latvian League finals.

Personal life 
Vētra has two daughters who played NCAA Division I college basketball. Laura played at Fairfield Stags from 2009-13. Ruta was a guard at NJIT Highlanders from 2013-17.

NBA career statistics

Regular season

|-
| align="left" | 1992–93
| align="left" | Minnesota
| 13 || 0 || 6.8 || .475|| 1.000 || .667 || .6 || .5 || .2 || .0 || 3.5
|- class="sortbottom"
| style="text-align:left;"| Career
| style="text-align:left;"| 
| 13 || 0 || 6.8 || .475 || 1.000 || .667 || .6 || .5 || .2 || .0 || 3.5

External links
 Gundars Vētra at basketball-reference.com

1967 births
Living people
BC Spartak Saint Petersburg coaches
BK VEF Rīga players
Basketball players at the 1992 Summer Olympics
Galatasaray S.K. (men's basketball) players
Latvian basketball coaches
Latvian expatriate basketball people in Italy
Latvian expatriate basketball people in Russia
Latvian expatriate basketball people in Turkey
Latvian expatriate basketball people in the United States
Latvian men's basketball players
Minnesota Timberwolves players
National Basketball Association players from Latvia
Olympic basketball players of the Unified Team
People from Ventspils
Rochester Renegade players
Shooting guards
Small forwards
Soviet men's basketball players
Undrafted National Basketball Association players
1990 FIBA World Championship players